Miss Europe 1957, was the 20th edition of the Miss Europe pageant and the ninth under the Mondial Events Organization (MEO). It was held in Baden-Baden, Germany on 26 June 1957. Corine Rottschäfer of Holland, was crowned Miss Europe 1957 by outgoing titleholder Margit Nünke of Germany.

Results

Placements

Special awards

Contestants 

 - Elisabeth "Sissy" Schübelauer
 - Madeleine Hotelet
 - Lilian Juul Madsen
 - Sonia Hamilton
 - Marita Lindahl†
 -  Geneviève Zanetti
 - Gerti Daub
 - Maria Tsipi
 - Corine Rottschäfer† 
 - Runa Brynjolfsdottir
 - Bianca Maria Vitelli
 - Josee Jaminet
 - Viola López Martínez
 - Rigmor Alfredsson
 - Suna Azak

"Comité Officiel et International Miss Europe" Competition

From 1951 to 2002 there was a rival Miss Europe competition organized by the "Comité Officiel et International Miss Europe". This was founded in 1950 by Jean Raibaut in Paris, the headquarters later moved to Marseille. The winners wore different titles like Miss Europe, Miss Europa or Miss Europe International.

This year's competition took place in Paris, France. The number of entries is unknown. At the end, Ingrid Weiss of Germany was crowned as Miss Europa 1957. Weiss succeeded predecessor Sylviane Carpentier of France.

Placements

Contestants

 - Ingrid Weiss
 - Bosilka Vidovic

References

External links 
 

1957 in Germany
1957 beauty pageants
Miss Europe